Cantor's roundleaf bat (Hipposideros galeritus) is a species of bat in the family Hipposideridae. It is found in Bangladesh, Brunei, Cambodia, India, Indonesia, Laos, Malaysia, Sri Lanka, Thailand and Vietnam.

It is named after Theodore Edward Cantor, a 19th-century Danish physician, zoologist, and botanist.

References 

Hipposideros
Bats of South Asia
Bats of Southeast Asia
Bats of India
Bats of Indonesia
Bats of Malaysia
Mammals of Borneo
Mammals of Bangladesh
Mammals of Cambodia
Mammals of Laos
Mammals of Nepal
Mammals of the Philippines
Mammals of Sri Lanka
Mammals of Thailand
Mammals of Vietnam
Mammals described in 1846
Taxonomy articles created by Polbot